Fourier profilometry is a method for measuring profiles using distortions in periodic patterns.  The method uses Fourier analysis (a 2-dimensional fast Fourier transform) to determine localized slopes on a curving surface.

This allows a x, y, z coordinate system of the surface to be generated from a single image which has been overlaid with the distortion pattern.

It is used specifically in measuring the shape of the human cornea for use in contact lens design.

References

Optical metrology